= NRY =

NRY may refer to:

- Non-recombining Region of the Y chromosome
- North Riding of Yorkshire (Chapman code)
